Shontel Monique Brown (born June 24, 1975) is an American politician who has served as the U.S. representative for Ohio's 11th congressional district since 2021. A member of the Democratic Party, Brown previously served as a member of the Cuyahoga County Council, representing the 9th district. She won her congressional seat in a special election on November 2, 2021, after Marcia Fudge resigned to become Secretary of Housing and Urban Development.

Early life and education
Brown earned an Associate of Science degree in business management from Cuyahoga Community College. She has a Bachelor of Science degree in organizational management from Wilberforce University.

Career 
Brown founded Diversified Digital Solutions, a marketing support company. She was elected to the Warrensville Heights City Council in 2011, where she held office for three years. In 2014, she was elected to the 9th District on the Cuyahoga County Council, succeeding Councilwoman C. Ellen Connally. Her district includes much of eastern Cuyahoga County, including Warrensville Heights, Bedford, Shaker Heights, Orange, and part of eastern Cleveland. In 2017, she was elected chair of the Cuyahoga County Democratic Party, defeating State Senator Sandra Williams and Newburgh Heights Mayor Trevor Elkins. Upon taking office, Brown became the first woman and the first African American to serve as Cuyahoga County Democratic party chair.

As a U.S. representative, Brown supported the Build Back Better Act.

U.S. House of Representatives

Elections

2021 special

2022 
Brown defeated Nina Turner in the May 3, 2022, Democratic primary for the 11th district. She was endorsed by President Joe Biden and the Congressional Progressive Caucus; the Congressional Progressive Caucus had supported Turner in the Democratic primary for Ohio's 11th congressional district special election in 2021.

Committee assignments
Committee on Agriculture
Committee on Oversight and Reform

Caucus memberships 
Congressional Black Caucus
Congressional Equality Caucus
New Democrat Coalition
Congressional Progressive Caucus

Electoral history

2022 Ohio's 11th congressional district election

2021 Ohio's 11th congressional district special election

See also 
 List of African-American United States representatives
 Women in the United States House of Representatives

References

External links 

 Congresswoman Shontel Brown official U.S. House website
 Campaign website

 

|-

|-

1975 births
20th-century African-American people
21st-century African-American women
21st-century African-American politicians
21st-century American politicians
21st-century American women politicians
African-American city council members in Ohio
African-American members of the United States House of Representatives
African-American women in politics
Cuyahoga Community College alumni
Democratic Party members of the United States House of Representatives from Ohio
Female members of the United States House of Representatives
Living people
People from Warrensville Heights, Ohio
Politicians from Cleveland
Women city councillors in Ohio
20th-century African-American women
Cuyahoga County Council members